Sir Ross Frederick Cranston  (born 23 July 1948) is a professor of Law at London School of Economics and a retired High Court judge. He is also a former British Labour Party politician, and served as the Member of Parliament for Dudley North between 1997 and 2005.

Early life
Cranston was born in Australia, and attended Wavell State High School in Brisbane, Queensland. He was later a student at the University of Queensland where he was awarded a BA in 1969 and LLB in 1970. From Harvard Law School, he gained LLM in 1973. From Oxford University, he was awarded DPhil in 1976 and DCL in 1998. He became a barrister of Gray's Inn in 1976.

Cranston was a professor at London School of Economics from 1992 to 1997 and the holder of the Cassell chair in commercial law from 1993 to 1997. Before that he held academic posts in the UK and Australia and the Sir John Lubbock chair in banking law at QMW, being a professor of Law at Queen Mary and Westfield College from 1986 to 1991. He was made a Queen's Counsel in 1998.

Parliamentary career
After contesting Richmond in North Yorkshire in 1992, William Hague's seat, coming third, Cranston was elected as the Member of Parliament for Dudley North at the next general election in 1997 with more than half of the votes cast. He served as Solicitor General from 1998 to 2001, when he returned to the back benches. After speculation amongst colleagues, he announced in 2005 that he would not stand for Parliament again in the 2005 general election. He was succeeded by Ian Austin.

Law career
Cranston was the Centennial Professor of Law at the LSE from 2005 to 2007, and returned as a professor of law from 2017.

Appointed as a High Court judge in October 2007, he was assigned to the Queen's Bench Division. Marcel Berlins wrote in The Guardian at the time that Cranston's appointment was unusual among judicial appointments in recent years, given that it occurred so soon after the end of his political career. Cranston retired with effect from 16 March 2017.

References

External links
 Guardian Unlimited Politics – Ask Aristotle: Ross Cranston MP
 TheyWorkForYou.com – Ross Cranston MP

1948 births
Living people
Harvard Law School alumni
Knights Bachelor
Labour Party (UK) MPs for English constituencies
People from Brisbane
Members of Gray's Inn
Queen's Bench Division judges
Solicitors General for England and Wales
University of Queensland alumni
UK MPs 1997–2001
UK MPs 2001–2005
Australian emigrants to England
Fellows of the British Academy